Trachygamasus is a genus of mites in the family Parasitidae.

Species
 Trachygamasus ambulacralis (Willmann, 1949)     
 Trachygamasus biplumatus Karg, 1998     
 Trachygamasus borealis Ma-Liming & Wang-Shenron, 1996     
 Trachygamasus gracilis Karg, 1965     
 Trachygamasus pusillus (Berlese, 1892)     
 Trachygamasus triangulus Karg, 1978

References

Parasitidae